Merope (Greek: Μερόπη) was originally the name of several, probably unrelated, characters in Greek mythology. The name may refer to:

Greek mythology
 Merope (mythology), name of Greek mythological characters.

Books and music
 Merope, an 18th-century opera libretto written by Apostolo Zeno and set to music by a number of composers, including Geminiano Giacomelli and Riccardo Broschi
 Merope Riddle (née Gaunt), mother of Lord Voldemort in the Harry Potter series by J. K. Rowling
 Merope (play), a 1731 play by George Jeffreys
 Mérope, a 1743 play by Voltaire
 Merope Ward, a main character in the 2010 two-part novel Blackout/All Clear by Connie Willis
 "Merope", tragic poem by Matthew Arnold, 1858

Plants and animals
Merope (insect), a genus of Mecoptera
Merope (plant), a plant genus in the subfamily Aurantioideae

Astronomy
 1051 Merope, an asteroid
 Merope (star), in the constellation Taurus and a member of the Pleiades star cluster

Places
 Merope (region), historical region of Thrace